Kevin Casey may refer to:

 Kevin A. Casey (born 1955), American author, musician and humorist
 Kevin Casey (fighter) (born 1981), American mixed martial artist
 Kevin Casey (broadcaster) (1976–2017), Irish radio presenter
 Kevin Casey, a 2007 character from the Australian television soap opera Neighbours
 Kevin Casey (Scrubs), a character from the American medical comedy-drama television series Scrubs